Paramount Animation is an American animation studio, serving as the animation division and label of Paramount Pictures, a subsidiary of Paramount Global. The division was founded on July 6, 2011, following the box office success of Paramount's own Rango and the end of their distribution deal with DreamWorks Animation in 2012.

The studio's first film The SpongeBob Movie: Sponge Out of Water was released on February 6, 2015, and its latest release being Rumble on December 15, 2021, with their next release being Saving Bikini Bottom: The Sandy Cheeks Movie in 2023 and Under the Boardwalk on an unspecified date. 

Films produced by Paramount Animation have grossed a total of $604.1 million at the box office. Its highest-grossing film to date is The SpongeBob Movie: Sponge Out of Water, which grossed $325.1 million.

Background
After the closure of Paramount Cartoon Studios (formerly named Famous Studios) in December 1967, Paramount distributed a few animated films from 1973 to 1992 that were produced by outside studios, including Charlotte's Web, Race for Your Life, Charlie Brown, Bon Voyage, Charlie Brown (and Don't Come Back!!), and Bébé's Kids.

Following Paramount's merger with Viacom, the studio started releasing several animated films based on Nickelodeon's TV shows, including the Rugrats film trilogy, The SpongeBob SquarePants Movie, and Jimmy Neutron: Boy Genius. The studio also released features based on MTV's Beavis and Butt-Head and Comedy Central's South Park.

In 2005, Paramount's new CEO Brad Grey considered building an in-house animation division, because he saw family films as the "sweet spot" of the movie business. The following year, Paramount signed a distribution deal with DreamWorks Animation, which filled the studio's schedule with animated films including Over the Hedge, Flushed Away, the third and fourth installments of the Shrek series and How to Train Your Dragon.  During this deal, the studio released Barnyard in 2006 and Beowulf in 2007.

On March 4, 2011, the studio released its first in-house animated film, Rango. The film was critically acclaimed and grossed over $245 million at the box office. The success of Rango helped Paramount discover its potential in making successful animated features on its own. In June, the studio acquired the rights to produce an animated film based on Penny Arcade's 2010 webcomic The New Kid.

History

Brad Grey era (2011–2017)

In July 2011, in the wake of Rango'''s success, the high hopes for The Adventures of Tintin, and the departure of DreamWorks Animation upon completion of their distribution contract with Madagascar 3: Europe's Most Wanted and Rise of the Guardians in 2012, Paramount announced the formation of a new animation division. The studio would initially produce one animated film a year with a maximum budget of $100 million. A key portion of the films would be co-produced with Nickelodeon and they would be cross-promoted at Nickelodeon's theme parks and hotels.

In October 2011, Paramount named a former president of Walt Disney Feature Animation, David Stainton, president of Paramount Animation. In February 2012, Stainton resigned for personal reasons, with Paramount Film Group's president, Adam Goodman, stepping in to directly oversee the studio. It was also announced that The SpongeBob Movie: Sponge Out of Water, a standalone sequel to 2004's The SpongeBob SquarePants Movie, would be the studio's first film and would be released in 2014. A short time after, the film was delayed to early 2015.

In August 2012, Variety reported that Paramount Animation was in the process of starting development of several animated films in collaboration with Nickelodeon, Mary Parent, and J. J. Abrams. Besides the SpongeBob sequel, Paramount Animation considered adapting Dora the Explorer, The Legend of Korra, and Monkey Quest into films. The increase in animated film production was due to DreamWorks Animation being in talks with other studios to distribute their post-2012 animated films.

On July 31, 2013, Paramount Animation announced that they were developing a new live-action/animated franchise in the vein of the Transformers series, which was titled Monster Trucks. Jonathan Aibel and Glenn Berger were set to write the film's script, Chris Wedge (director of 2002's Ice Age) was set to direct the film, and Mary Parent was set to produce the film, with an initial release date set for May 29, 2015.

The studio's first film, The SpongeBob Movie: Sponge Out of Water on February 6, 2015, to positive reviews and was a box office success, grossing over $325 million worldwide and becoming the fifth highest grossing animated film of 2015. That same month, Paramount fired Adam Goodman due to the studio's thin film slate and Goodman greenlighting box office bombs at the studio. Paramount announced another SpongeBob film later that year.

In the summer of 2015, Paramount Pictures participated in a bidding war against Warner Bros. and Sony Pictures Animation for the rights to produce The Emoji Movie, based on a script by Tony Leondis and Eric Siegel. Sony won the bidding war in July and released the film in 2017. The studio's head Bob Bacon also left Paramount Animation that summer.

In June 2015, it was revealed that Spain's Ilion Animation Studios (the studio behind 2009's Planet 51) won a bidding war against other animation studios to produce a 3D animated tentpole film for Paramount Animation, which was already in production since 2014. In November 2015, Paramount Animation officially announced the project as Amusement Park, (later renamed Wonder Park) with former Pixar animator Dylan Brown helming. The studio also announced Monster Trucks, The Little Prince, Sherlock Gnomes, and the third SpongeBob film.

The studio's second film, The Little Prince, was released on July 29, 2015 in France. It was scheduled to be released on March 18, 2016 in the United States, but Paramount canceled the American release due to the French producers not paying an additional, previously agreed $20 million for the North American prints and advertising budget, however they still retained the distribution rights in France. It was later released onto Netflix on August 5, 2016 as a Netflix original film.

The studio's third film, Anomalisa, was given a limited release on December 30, 2015 while getting a wider release in January the following year. It received positive reviews, but grossed $5.7 million on an $8 million budget.

On May 4, 2016, Paramount Pictures announced that they had signed a deal with UK-based Locksmith Animation to co-develop and co-produce three original animated projects to be released under the Paramount Animation label (with animation produced by DNEG).

The studio's fourth film, Monster Trucks was released to mixed reviews and became a box office failure, grossing $64.5 million on a $125 million budget and losing the studio $120 million.
 
In March 2017, Skydance Media formed a multi-year partnership with Ilion Animation Studios, forming Skydance Animation.

Jim Gianopulos/Mireille Soria era (2017–2021)
In April 2017, Paramount ended its deal with Locksmith Animation when Paramount chairman and CEO Brad Grey was replaced by Jim Gianopulos, who decided that their projects did not fit in with Paramount's other upcoming releases. Locksmith formed a multi-year production deal with 20th Century Fox four months later.

In July 2017, Paramount Pictures named former DreamWorks Animation co-president Mireille Soria as the president of the studio. Soria restructured the studio, increasing its number of employees from 10 to over 110, and created a new goal of releasing two tentpole animated films a year with different animation styles and genres. She would also look over the completion of Sherlock Gnomes and Wonder Park, which were in production before her arrival. That same month, Skydance announced its first two animated feature films for Skydance Animation — Split (later retitled Spellbound) and Luck. Both films would be distributed by Paramount Pictures as part of their deal with Skydance. On October 10, 2017, Bill Damaschke was hired to head the division as president of animation and family entertainment.

The studio released its fifth film, Sherlock Gnomes on March 23, 2018, and became a critical and financial disappointment, grossing $90.3 million on a $59 million budget.

In April 2018, Paramount Pictures named former Blue Sky Studios and Nickelodeon Movies producer Ramsey Naito as the executive vice president of the studio. She later left the company in order to become the head of animation at Nickelodeon. In the same month, Soria greenlit the studio's first three animated features under her leadership to be released in 2020 and beyond: The SpongeBob Movie: It's a Wonderful Sponge (later renamed Sponge On the Run), Reel FX's Monster on the Hill (later renamed Rumble), and Skydance Animation's Luck.

On January 14, 2019, Mireille Soria announced that the team at Paramount Animation will no longer work with Skydance Animation because of their hiring of former Walt Disney Animation Studios and Pixar CCO John Lasseter as the head of animation. Luck and Spellbound were still going to be released by Paramount Pictures without the Paramount Animation brand until Apple TV+ acquired the distribution rights to both films in December 2020 and made a larger pact with Skydance Animation in February 2021. Apple Original Films would replace Paramount for both Luck and Spellbound.

The studio's sixth film, Wonder Park was released on March 15, 2019. It received mixed reviews and it became a box office flop, grossing only $119.6 million worldwide on a budget of less than $100 million.

In June 2019, Paramount Animation announced a new slate of animated features, including an animated Spice Girls film, a live-action/animated Mighty Mouse film, an animated film adaptation of The Tiger's Apprentice, a musical film titled Jersey Crabs (later Under the Boardwalk), and the Imagine Entertainment co-production The Shrinking of Treehorn.

The studio's seventh film The SpongeBob Movie: Sponge on the Run theatrically released only in Canada on August 14, 2020, with a March 4, 2021 release in the United States on Paramount+ and a November 5, 2020 release internationally on Netflix due to the COVID-19 pandemic. The film received positive reviews from critics, and grossed $4.4 million worldwide with a $60 million budget.

In January 2021, Paramount Animation picked up two new films: an adaption of the upcoming Tom Wheeler book C.O.S.M.O.S. and an original animated film from the Comedy Central star Trevor Noah.

Brian Robbins/Ramsey Naito era (2021–present)
On September 30, 2021, shortly after Brian Robbins replaced Jim Gianopulos as the chairman and CEO of Paramount Pictures, it was announced that Ramsey Naito would replace Mireille Soria as the president of Paramount Animation in addition to her current role as the president of Nickelodeon Animation Studio.

The studio's eighth film Rumble was released on December 15, 2021 on Paramount+. It was originally expected to be released on February 18, 2022, but due to the COVID-19 pandemic, it was later moved to Paramount+. It received mixed reviews.

On January 20, 2022, Latifa Ouaou (a veteran of both Illumination and DreamWorks Animation via Universal Pictures) was hired as the executive vice president of movies and global franchises for both Paramount Animation and Nickelodeon Animation Studio. In this position, Ouaou will oversee both streaming and theatrical films for the two companies. It was also revealed that The Tiger’s Apprentice (which was originally being directed by Carlos Baena) will now be directed by Raman Hui, with Paul Watling and Yong Duk Jhun being co-directors. Bob Persichetti (the Academy Award-winning co-director of Sony Pictures Animation's Spider-Man: Into the Spider-Verse) had also joined the film as a producer.

Logo

Initially, Paramount Animation did not have its own opening logo. Its first six features just used the standard Paramount logo. On September 19, 2019, Paramount Animation introduced a new animated logo featuring a character nicknamed "Star Skipper". When Mireille Soria came to Paramount Animation, one of the first goals set by Jim Gianopulos was to make a logo for the division. The crew wanted to put a female character in the logo because the studio's team is mostly female, and according to Soria, it captures "the magic" of the division. The logo and the character of Star Skipper were designed by Captain Underpants: The First Epic Movie lead visual development artist and art director Christopher Zibach and animated by ATK PLN and Reel FX Creative Studios. This logo debuted in front of The SpongeBob Movie: Sponge on the Run in 2020. The logo's music is the same as the standard Paramount Pictures logo, which is composed by Michael Giacchino.

Process
Similar to Warner Animation Group,  Universal's Illumination Entertainment, and Sony Pictures Animation, Paramount Animation outsources its animation production to other animation studios such as Mikros Image and Reel FX. Rumble was developed outside of Paramount Animation by Reel FX, but the studio acquired the rights to the film and co-produced it.

Like 20th Century Animation with animated films under 20th Century Studios, the studio also acts as somewhat of a distribution label for animated films that are made under or acquired by Paramount Pictures. The earliest case of this would be the aborted deal with Locksmith Animation. Additionally, Paws of Fury: The Legend of Hank'', originally expected to be distributed by Open Road Films and STX Entertainment, was acquired by Paramount to be distributed under Paramount Animation, later being distributed  under Nickelodeon Movies.

Paramount Animation does not have an in-house animation style. According to Mireille Soria, each film has their own unique style created by the filmmakers, which would be helped by outsourcing animation to different vendors.

When Ramsey Naito took charge of Paramount Animation in September 2021, she brought over the culture of the Nickelodeon Animation Studio, which she describes as "artist-driven" and "creative". Both companies are now united under one team, in a move different from Disney and Universal's animation studios (Walt Disney Animation Studios and Pixar post-Lasseter for the former and Illumination and DreamWorks for the latter).

Filmography

Feature films

Released films

Upcoming films

In development

Related productions
All films listed are distributed by Paramount Pictures unless noted otherwise.

Cancelled or inactive projects

Reception

Box office grosses

Critical and public response

Accolades

Academy Awards

Annie Awards

Golden Raspberry Awards

Notes

See also
Nickelodeon Movies
List of Paramount Pictures theatrical animated feature films
Terrytoons

References

External links

2011 establishments in California
American companies established in 2011
American animation studios
Paramount Pictures
Entertainment companies based in California
Film production companies of the United States
Mass media companies established in 2011
Companies based in Los Angeles
Entertainment companies established in 2011
Animation studios owned by Paramount Global